Luo Yu (born 11 January 1991) is a Chinese badminton player who specializes in doubles. Together with her twin sister, Luo Ying, they competed in the international badminton, and were ranked as World number 1 on 10 March 2016. The twins participated at the Rio 2016 Summer Olympics but did not advance to the knocked-out stage after placing third in the group stage. The biggest title of their career to date, the 2015 BWF Superseries Finals, sent the pair to #1 in the world rankings.

Achievements

Asian Championships 
Women's doubles

Summer Universiade 
Women's doubles

Asian Junior Championships 
Girls' doubles

BWF Superseries 
The BWF Superseries, which was launched on 14 December 2006 and implemented in 2007, is a series of elite badminton tournaments, sanctioned by the Badminton World Federation (BWF). BWF Superseries levels are Superseries and Superseries Premier. A season of Superseries consists of twelve tournaments around the world that have been introduced since 2011. Successful players are invited to the Superseries Finals, which are held at the end of each year.

Women's doubles

  BWF Superseries Finals tournament
  BWF Superseries Premier tournament
  BWF Superseries tournament

BWF Grand Prix 
The BWF Grand Prix had two levels, the BWF Grand Prix and Grand Prix Gold. It was a series of badminton tournaments sanctioned by the Badminton World Federation (BWF) which was held from 2007 to 2017.

Women's doubles

  BWF Grand Prix Gold tournament
  BWF Grand Prix tournament

BWF International Challenge/Series 
Women's doubles

  BWF International Challenge tournament
  BWF International Series tournament

References

External links 
 
 

1991 births
Living people
Chinese twins
Twin sportspeople
Badminton players from Shandong
Chinese female badminton players
Badminton players at the 2016 Summer Olympics
Olympic badminton players of China
Universiade silver medalists for China
Universiade medalists in badminton
Medalists at the 2013 Summer Universiade
World No. 1 badminton players
21st-century Chinese women